Ethinylandrostenediol (developmental code name SKF-2856), also known as 17α-ethynyl-5-androstenediol, is a synthetic estrogen, progestogen, and androgen which was never marketed. It is the C17α ethynyl derivative of the androgen precursor and prohormone 5-androstenediol.

Ethinylandrostenediol was first synthesized in the late 1930s and along with its close analogue ethisterone (17α-ethynyltestosterone) was one of the first progestins (synthetic progestogens) to be developed. Ethinylandrostenediol is orally active similarly to ethisterone and shows about half its progestogenic potency. Ethinylandrostenediol was an intermediate in the initial synthesis of ethisterone.

Ethinylandrostenediol shows tissue selectivity in its estrogenic effects in animals and doesn't seem to have estrogenic effects in the uterus. The androgenic activity of ethinylandrostenediol is weak.

An ester of ethinylandrostenediol, ethandrostate (17α-ethynyl-5-androstenediol 3β-cyclohexylpropionate), has been studied clinically in men and women with prostate cancer and breast cancer, respectively.

Notable structural analogues of ethinylandrostenediol include 5-androstenediol, 17α-ethynyl-3β-androstanediol, 17α-ethynyl-3α-androstanediol, ethisterone (17α-ethynyltestosterone), and methandriol (17α-methyl-5-androstenediol), as well as ethinylestradiol (17α-ethynylestradiol or 17α-ethynylestra-1,3,5(10)-triene-3,17β-diol).

References

Abandoned drugs
Ethynyl compounds
Androgens and anabolic steroids
Androstanes
Antigonadotropins
Diols
Prodrugs
Progestogens
Synthetic estrogens